The Holy Lie is a 1927 German silent film directed by Holger-Madsen and starring Otto Gebühr, Margarete Schlegel, and Paul Bildt.

The film's art direction was by Max Knaake.

Cast

References

Bibliography

External links

1927 films
Films of the Weimar Republic
Films directed by Holger-Madsen
German silent feature films
German films based on plays
German black-and-white films
National Film films